Pier Luigi Luisi (born 23 May 1938) is an Italian chemist and academic. He received the "professor emeritus" title from the Swiss Federal Institute of Technology (ETHZ). He worked there as a scientist from 1970 until 2003, and as a Professor of Chemistry from 1980 until he departed. Luisi then moved to the Roma Tre University as a Professor of Biochemistry, where he worked until 2015.

In 1985, Luisi founded the Cortona Week, an international summer school.

Personal life
Pier Luigi Luisi was born on 23 May 1938. He is now a retired professor and lives in Tavira, Portugal.

Education
Luisi graduated with a chemistry degree from the Scuola Normale Superiore di Pisa.

Books

The Systems View of Life: A Unifying Vision (with Fritjof Capra) Cambridge University Press, 2014, translated in several languages. The Italian edition was published by Aboca, 2014, under the title Vita e Natura - Una visione sistemica.
The Emergence of Life: From Chemical Origins to Synthetic Biology Cambridge University Press, second edition 2016
Giant Vesicles (Perspectives in Supramolecular Chemistry) (with Peter Walde)
 Mind and life: discussions with the Dalai Lama on the nature of reality, Columbia University Press, 2009,

References

External links
 Pier Luigi Luisi on Lifeboat Foundation
 Pier Luigi Luisi on Meer.com
 Pier Luigi Luisi on Meer.com
 Pier Luigi Luisi on Meer.com

1938 births
Living people
Scuola Normale Superiore di Pisa alumni
Swiss chemists
Synthetic biologists
Academic staff of Roma Tre University